Cserkeszőlő is a village in Jász-Nagykun-Szolnok county, in the Northern Great Plain region of central Hungary.

Cserkeszőlő is a dynamically developing bath resort in Jász-Nagykun-Szolnok county, in the south part of Northern Great Plains Region. The village lies in the Tiszazug microregion, in the natural environment bordered by the rivers Körös and Tisza. The township is easy to reach from any point of the country. From Budapest, Highway M5, then from Kecskemét Main Road 44 lead to the village. Developing the bath has been the main strategy of the township for decades. As a result, the spa became well-known not only nationwide but internationally too.

Geography

History

A Hungarian-American Oil Searching Company found the future fame of Cserkeszőlő, the 93 °C (199.4 °F) thermal water in 1938, that rose from a depth range of more than 2,000 m. The well was closed during the Second World War and it was reconstructed in 1948. The investigations have discovered later - what the people, who were digging holes in the sand, around the draining depth water, sensed instinctively - Cserkeszőlő thermal water is an effective medicinal water. Grape production in sandy soil has played a really great part in the emergence of Cserkeszőlő, the name, used also today has been improved this way. The construction of the spa was started in 1954 - it has become more and more popular among the inhabitants of the neighbour villages and towns. Despite the deservedly famous medicinal water, the development of the spa and its environment was not properly emphasized until 1998, but Cserkeszőlő spa has been completely reconstructed and significantly developed in last years, its environment has been beautified, thus it welcomes the guests in a dignified way.

Origin of the Name

The typical plant of the area („szőlő“ means grapes) is included in the name of Cserkeszőlő as well. While the word "cserke" can be traced back to the Middle Ages, during the rule of King Béla IV, when Jordanian tribes arrived to the present place of the village.

Sights

 Cserkeszőlő Bath and Therapy Center
 Winery and cellar
 Catholic Church
 Calvinist Church

Population

Gallery

References

External links

 Official site in Hungarian, English, German, French, Romanian, Russian and Polish
Cserkeszőlő at funiq.hu

Populated places in Jász-Nagykun-Szolnok County